The 1972 Campeonato Argentino de Rugby  was won by the selection of Buenos Aires that beat in the final the selection of  Rosario

That year in Argentine rugby 
 Nel 1972 was played the first "South American Under-19 championship" ("Sudamericano Juvenil"), won by Argentina, and also the first Argentinian Under-19 Championship-won by the selection of Unión de Rugby de Rosario.
 The selection South African "Gazelles" (Under-23) visit Argentina in Tour, playing against the selection of Sur, Córdoba, Tucumán, Salta, Santa Fe and Rosario, and the Argentine national team.
 The Buenos Aires Champsionship was won by San Isidro Club
 The Cordoba Province Championship was won by Tala
 The North-East Championship was won by Universitario Tucuman

Knock out stages

Semifinals 
 Score system: try = 3 points, conversion=2 point, penalty kick, and kick from mark=3 points. Drop = 3 points. 

Buenos Aires: 15.Dudley Morgan,  14.Mario Walter,  13.Raúl Matarazzo,  12.Tomás Harris Smith 11.Alejandro Albertg, 10.Hugo Porta 9.Adolfo Etchegaray,  8.Jorge Cariacedo 7.Jorge Wittman 6.Hugo Miguens,  5.F.Virasoro 4.José J.Fernández,  3.Mario Carluccio,  2.Ricardo Handley 1.Oscar Carbone.
Cordoba: 15. F. Mesquida,  14.H. Espinosa 13.J. Martínez,  12.R. Resella 11.C. Antoraz,  10.R Agüero,  9.J. Peralta, 8.C. Barbosa,  7.J. Aguad,  6.J. Larson,  5.R. Pesagli 4.R. Gómez,  3.G. Ribeca,  2.H. Bianchi  1.Carlos Dunn

 Santa Fè: 15.Eduardo Tenka,  14.Alberto Caino,  13.Jorge Rapella,  12.Julián Quevedo,  11.Eduardo Sales,  10.Jorge Cresmann,  9.Julián Legna,  8.Eduardo Ferrari,  7.A. Campanella,  6.Manuel Calentano,  5.Pascual Giardini,  4.Julián Angeletti,  3.Carlos Abut,  2.Jorge Tejerina,  1.Carlos Colombo
Rosario : 15.Lisandro Huljich,  14.Guillermo Blanco,  13.Cesar Blanco,  12.Alfredo Fasse,  11.Carlos García,  10.Martín Escalante,  9.Joaquín Scilabria,  8.Sabino Furno,  7.Jorge Fradua,  6.José Constante,  5.Mario Bouza,  4.Rubén Suárez 3.Ricardo Imhoff 2.Miguel Chesta,  2.Eduardo Manini.

Final 

 Buenos Aires: 15. D. Morgan,  14. A. Altberg,  13. A. Brown,  12. R. Matarazzo,  11. M. Walter,  10H.Porta,  9. A. Etchegaray,  8. H. Miguens,  7. J. Wittman,  6. J. Cariacedo,  5. A. Anthony,   4. J. J. Fernández,  3.O. Carbone,  2.R. Handley,  1.M. Carluccio.
 Rosario: 15. J. Seaton,  14. C. García,  13. C. Blanco,  12. A. Fasce,  11.G. Blanco,  10.J. Scilabra,  9. M. Escalante,  8. J.C. Imhoff,  7. M. Chesta,  6. E. Manini,  5. R. Suárez,  4. M. Bouza, 3.S. Furno,  2. J. Fradua,   1.J. Constante.

Bibliography 
  Memorias de la UAR 1972
  XXVIII Campeonato Argentino 

Campeonato Argentino de Rugby